Pride is the first studio album of Swedish group Yaki-Da. The album was released in 1995. The lead single, "I Saw You Dancing" reached number 54 on the Billboard Hot 100 and number 11 on the Billboard Dance Charts. The album was successful in Europe, reaching number two in Norway and the top 40 in Sweden.

Track listing 
All lyrics and music by Jonas "Joker" Berggren, except where noted.
 "Just a Dream" – 3:20
 "I Saw You Dancing" – 3:49 
 "Pride of Africa" – 3:37
 "Show Me Love" – 3:29
 "Teaser on the Catwalk" (Lyrics: Berggren, Marie Knutsten; Music: Berggren) – 3:37
 "Another Better World" – 3:46
 "Mejor Mañana" (Lyrics: Berggren, John Ballard, Linda Schoenberg; Music: Berggren) – 3:25 
 "Deep in the Jungle" (Lyrics and music: Knutsen, Berggren) – 4:13
 "Now I Want Love" (Lyrics and music: Knutsen) – 4:04
 "Pride of Africa" (Remix) – 4:36
 "Show Me Love" (Acoustic Version) – 3:26 
 "Rescue Me Tonight" (Lyrics: Knutsen, Ballard; Music: Knutsen) – 4:13

Singles 
 "I Saw You Dancing"
 "Show Me Love"
 "Pride of Africa"
 "Deep in the Jungle"

Credits
Artwork – René Hedemyr 
Photography – Michael Johansson 
Producer – Jonas "Joker" Berggren (tracks: 1 to 8, 10, 11)

Charts

References 

1995 debut albums
Yaki-Da albums